A Golden Widow (French: Une veuve en or) is a 1969 comedy film directed by Michel Audiard and starring Michèle Mercier, Claude Rich and Roger Carel. It was made as a co-production between France, Italy and West Germany.

The film's sets were designed by the art directors Jean d'Eaubonne and Raymond Gabutti.

Synopsis
A woman discovers that she has inherited a huge fortune from a relation. However the unusual terms of inheritance state that she must be a widow, otherwise the money will go elsewhere. She seeks to get a gangster to murder her sculptor husband who in turn goes to other gangsters to seek protection.

Cast
 Michèle Mercier as Delphine Berger
 Claude Rich as Antoine Berger
 Roger Carel as Aristophane Percankas - un riche armateur grec
 Jean Carmet as Un membre du Yiddish International Power
 Daniel Ceccaldi as Le conservateur du musée
 Jean-Pierre Darras as Rapha - le chef du syndicat du crime
 Mario David as Monsieur Sigmund - un admirateur zurichois
 Folco Lulli as Le Sicilien - un tueur
 André Pousse as Pierre Déricourt de Savignac dit Pierrot le Farceur
 Sim as Il Vecchio - un tueur sur le retour
 Jacques Dufilho as Joseph - un détective
 Max Amyl as Le Pierrot
 Jean Martin as Un lieutenant

References

Bibliography
 Oscherwitz, Dayna & Higgins, MaryEllen. The A to Z of French Cinema. Scarecrow Press, 2009.

External links

1969 films
West German films
German comedy films
Italian comedy films
1960s French-language films
Films directed by Michel Audiard
Films with screenplays by Michel Audiard
1969 comedy films
French comedy films
1960s French films
1960s Italian films
1960s German films